Kristinn Gunnlaugsson (12 July 1934 – 10 June 2001) was an Icelandic footballer. He played in nine matches for the Iceland national football team from 1955 to 1960.

References

External links
 

1934 births
2001 deaths
Kristinn Gunnlaugsson
Kristinn Gunnlaugsson
Place of birth missing
Association footballers not categorized by position